Bavaria 09 Berlin was a short-lived German association football club from the city of Berlin. Established in 1909, the club disappeared in 1933. They played a single season in the top flight Oberliga Berlin in 1921–22 and were sent down after an 11th-place finish. In 1927 the club joined the Märkische Spielvereinigung, a regional worker's sports club and an ATSB member, but split from it the next year. From 1930 to February 1933 Bavaria was a member of an ATSB splinter group and communist-leaning Kampfgemeinschaft für Rote Sporteinheit ("Rotsport"). Subsequently, it was disbanded like most other worker's or left-leaning clubs with the formation of Nazi Germany.

References

External links
 Das deutsche Fußball-Archiv - Historical German domestic league tables 

Football clubs in Germany
Defunct football clubs in Germany
Defunct football clubs in Berlin
Association football clubs established in 1909
1909 establishments in Germany
1933 disestablishments in Germany
Association football clubs disestablished in 1933
German workers' football clubs